In mathematics, the upper half-plane,  is the set of points  in the Cartesian plane with  > 0.
The lower half-space is defined similarly, by requiring that  be negative instead.

Complex plane
Mathematicians sometimes identify the Cartesian plane with the complex plane, and then the upper half-plane corresponds to the set of complex numbers with positive imaginary part:

The term arises from a common visualization of the complex number  as the point  in the plane endowed with Cartesian coordinates. When the  axis is oriented vertically, the "upper half-plane" corresponds to the region above the  axis and thus complex numbers for which  > 0.

It is the domain of many functions of interest in complex analysis, especially modular forms. The lower half-plane, defined by   < 0, is equally good, but less used by convention.

It also plays an important role in hyperbolic geometry, where the Poincaré half-plane model provides a way of examining hyperbolic motions. The Poincaré metric provides a hyperbolic metric on the space.

The uniformization theorem for surfaces states that the upper half-plane is the universal covering space of surfaces with constant negative Gaussian curvature.

The closed upper half-plane is the union of the upper half-plane and the real axis. It is the closure of the upper half-plane.

Affine geometry
The affine transformations of the upper half-plane include
 shifts (x,y) → (x + c, y), and
 dilations (x, y) → (λ x, λ  y),  λ > 0.

Proposition: Let A and B be semicircles in the upper half-plane with centers on the boundary. Then there is an affine mapping that takes A to B.
Proof: First shift the center of A to (0,0). Then take λ = (diameter of B)/(diameter of A) and dilate. Then shift (0,0) to the center of B.

Definition: 

 can be recognized as the circle of radius  centered at (0), and as the polar plot of 

In fact,  is the reflection of the line  in the unit circle. Indeed, the diagonal from (0,0) to  has squared length  so that  is the reciprocal of that length.

Metric geometry
In the latter case  and  lie on a ray perpendicular to the boundary and logarithmic measure can be used to define a distance that is invariant under dilation. In the former case  and  lie on a circle centered at the intersection of their perpendicular bisector and the boundary. In consequence, the upper half-plane becomes a metric space. The generic name of this metric space is the hyperbolic plane. In terms of the models of hyperbolic geometry, this model is frequently designated the Poincaré half-plane model.

Generalizations
One natural generalization in differential geometry is hyperbolic -space  the maximally symmetric, simply connected, -dimensional Riemannian manifold with constant sectional curvature −1. In this terminology, the upper half-plane is  since it has real dimension 2.

In number theory, the theory of Hilbert modular forms is concerned with the study of certain functions on the direct product  of  copies of the upper half-plane. Yet another space interesting to number theorists is the Siegel upper half-space  which is the domain of Siegel modular forms.

See also
 Cusp neighborhood
 Extended complex upper-half plane
 Fuchsian group
 Fundamental domain
 Half-space
 Kleinian group
 Modular group
 Riemann surface
 Schwarz–Ahlfors–Pick theorem
Moduli stack of elliptic curves

References

Complex analysis
Hyperbolic geometry
Differential geometry
Number theory
Modular forms

de:Obere Halbebene
it:Semipiano